Like There's No Tomorrow is the debut studio album by Australian hardcore band Mary Jane Kelly. It was released in March 2010.

Track listing
 "Intro" - 1:32   
 "Pigs Of Gluttony" - 2:59   
 "Wallflowers" - 3:02  
 "Hell In Gold Leaf Palaces" - 2:36   
 "The Imprecision Of My Dimensions" - 3:23   
 "Broken Hips, Burnt Cigars" - 2:43   
 "With A Bang To Mute Our Whimpers" - 2:27   
 "Filthy Lucre" - 2:22   
 "If God Were Here..." -2:33   
 "Weak, Corrupt, Worthless & Restless" - 2:42   
 "It's Just The Abyss" - 3:21

Credits
Justin Bortignon - Vocals
Matt Velozo - Guitar
Jamal Salem - Drums
Brendan Dive - Bass Guitar
Murray Adamson - Producer

References

2010 albums
Mary Jane Kelly (band) albums